Unionville Center is a village in Union County, Ohio, in the United States.  The population was 233 at the 2010 census.

The village is home to the Charles W. Fairbanks Festival that is held each May.  The village also supports a post office, with the ZIP Code of 43077.

History
Unionville Center was originally called Unionville, and under the latter name was laid out and platted in 1847. A post office called Unionville Center has been in operation since 1848. The village was incorporated in 1879.

Geography
Unionville Center is located at  (40.136336, -83.341501).

Demographics

The population of the village was 231 in 1890, 259 in 1900, and 239 in 1910.

2010 census
As of the census of 2010, there were 233 people, 78 households, and 56 families living in the village. The racial makeup of the village was 96.1% White, 0.4% Native American, 2.6% Asian, and 0.9% from two or more races. Hispanic or Latino of any race were 0.9% of the population.

There were 78 households, of which 42.3% had children under the age of 18 living with them, 53.8% were married couples living together, 12.8% had a female householder with no husband present, 5.1% had a male householder with no wife present, and 28.2% were non-families. 19.2% of all households were made up of individuals, and 9% had someone living alone who was 65 years of age or older. The average household size was 2.99 and the average family size was 3.38.

The median age in the village was 39.8 years. 29.6% of residents were under the age of 18; 6.4% were between the ages of 18 and 24; 23.7% were from 25 to 44; 28.4% were from 45 to 64; and 12% were 65 years of age or older. The gender makeup of the village was 51.5% male and 48.5% female.

2000 census
As of the census of 2000, there were 299 people, 110 households, and 85 families living in the village. The population density was 1,874.5 people per square mile (721.5/km). There were 121 housing units at an average density of 758.6 per square mile (292.0/km). The racial makeup of the village was 99.67% White, and 0.33% from two or more races. Hispanic or Latino of any race were 1.34% of the population.

There were 110 households, out of which 33.6% had children under the age of 18 living with them, 66.4% were married couples living together, 3.6% had a female householder with no husband present, and 22.7% were non-families. 21.8% of all households were made up of individuals, and 9.1% had someone living alone who was 65 years of age or older. The average household size was 2.72 and the average family size was 3.18.

In the village, the population was spread out, with 26.8% under the age of 18, 4.7% from 18 to 24, 30.4% from 25 to 44, 22.7% from 45 to 64, and 15.4% who were 65 years of age or older. The median age was 39 years. For every 100 females there were 103.4 males. For every 100 females age 18 and over, there were 99.1 males.

The median income for a household in the village was $45,682, and the median income for a family was $52,750. Males had a median income of $32,500 versus $23,750 for females. The per capita income for the village was $16,591. About 2.7% of families and 6.3% of the population were below the poverty line, including 9.5% of those under the age of eighteen and none of those 65 or over.

Notable person
Charles W. Fairbanks, twenty-sixth Vice President of the United States

References

External links
 Charles W. Fairbanks Festival

Villages in Union County, Ohio
Villages in Ohio